Shurab (also Romanized as Shūrāb, Showrab, and Shorab) is a town in Balkh Province, Afghanistan.

See also 
Balkh Province

References

Populated places in Balkh Province